The  Fédération Française du Bâtiment (FFB) represents 57,000 companies as well as approximately two thirds of the French building industry’s turnover and salaried staff. It was founded in 1904 by the merger of several regional organisations.

Goals
The goals of the FFB are to:

 Reduce constraints which hinder the building industry
 Stimulate social policy within the building industry, in particular with regards to prevention and safety
 Enhance the profession’s image
 Recapture the domestic market
 Develop public procurement and encourage local authorities to invest

Overview
The FFB is a network made up of 96 local federations, 27 regional federations and 30 trade unions. It actively promotes the restoration and preservation of buildings. Also, the FFB promotes sustainable construction.

To improve the environment and the built-up landscape
To enhance well-being inside buildings
To have better control of the use of raw materials
To save energy and to reduce pollution
To offer a better approach of water use and quality
To pay attention to quality and safety on building sites

References

External links
 Fédération Française du Bâtiment

Trade associations based in France